Kakvinskie Pechi is a village situated on the left bank of the Kakva River, part of Sverdlovsk Oblast, Russian Federation. The name of the village means furnaces of Kakva, referencing a time when local iron factories burned coal. The village was founded by the Komi peoples, a Permian ethnic group whose homeland is in the north-east of European Russia.

The village was liquidated in 2014.

References

Rural localities in Sverdlovsk Oblast